The Madonna dell'Impannata is an oil on panel (158x125 cm) painting by the Italian High Renaissance painter Raphael, executed c. 1513–1514. It has been preserved at the Palatine Gallery in Florence.

History 
Giorgio Vasari recorded that the painting was originally commissioned to Bindo Altoviti.

It portraits a very old Saint Anne who is seated and holds out to the Virgin her son. There is a Saint John seated, nude,  and behind Saint Anne another female saint.

Bindo sent the Madonna dell'Impannata to his palace in Florence, where the picture remained until Duke Cosimo I de' Medici confiscated it for his own chapel, newly decorated by Raphael.

During the Napoleonic occupation, the painting was brought to Paris in 1799, and then returned in 1815 .

See also
List of paintings by Raphael

References

 Pierluigi De Vecchi, Raphael, Rizzoli, Milan 1975.
 Marco Chiarini, Palatine Gallery and Royal Apartments, Syllables, Livorno 1998.

External links

Paintings of the Madonna and Child by Raphael
1514 paintings
Paintings in the collection of the Galleria Palatina
Nude art
Paintings of Elizabeth (biblical figure)
Paintings of Saint Anne
Paintings depicting John the Baptist